The fourteenth series of the British television drama series Grange Hill began broadcasting on 2 January 1991, before ending on 8 March 1991 on BBC One. The series follows the lives of the staff and pupils of the eponymous school, an inner-city London comprehensive school. It consists of twenty episodes.

Cast and characters

Pupils

Teachers

Others
Tina Mahon as Ronnie Birtles (episode 2)

Episodes

{| class="wikitable" style="width:100%;"
|-
! style="background-color: #333333; color:white"| No.
! style="background: #333333; color:white"| Episode
! style="background: #333333; color:white"| Writer
! style="background: #333333; color:white"| Director
! style="background: #333333; color:white"| Original airdate
|-
| align="center"| 1
| align="center"| Episode One
| align="center"| Sarah Daniels
| align="center"| Riitta-Leena Lynn
| align="center"| 8 January 1991
|-
| style="background:white" colspan="5" |Mr. Van Der Groot manages to impress his pupils. The heating system at the school causes problems.
|- style="background:#333333; height:2px"
| colspan="5" |
|-
| align="center"| 2
| align="center"| Episode Two
| align="center"| Kay Trainer
| align="center"| Riitta-Leena Lynn
| align="center"| 11 January 1991
|-
| style="background:white" colspan="5" | Trevor manages to get some work experience at a local Estate Agent. Calley gets her hospital test results which come back clear.
|- style="background:#333333; height:2px"
| colspan="5" |
|-
| align="center"| 3
| align="center"| Episode Three
| align="center"| Kay Trainer
| align="center"| Riitta-Leena Lynn
| align="center"| 15 January 1991
|-
| style="background:white" colspan="5" | Becky and Alice spy on the teachers and start a peaceful canteen protest. Matthew watches the "smugglers" from the tree-house in Richard's garden.
|- style="background:#333333; height:2px"
| colspan="5" |
|-
| align="center"| 4
| align="center"| Episode Four
| align="center"| Barry Purchese
| align="center"| Riitta-Leena Lynn
| align="center"| 18 January 1991
|-
| style="background:white" colspan="5" | Jacko and his friends attempt to get to Edinburgh. Georgina doesn't wait in for Mike when he is late. Justine learns from Tegs that he is moving to Germany.
|- style="background:#333333; height:2px"
| colspan="5" |
|-
| align="center"| 5
| align="center"| Episode Five
| align="center"| Barry Purchese
| align="center"| Richard Kelly
| align="center"| 22 January 1991
|-
| style="background:white" colspan="5" | Mike gets the chance to train in America. Jack and Locko pay Brian a visit who is very sick.
|- style="background:#333333; height:2px"
| colspan="5" |
|-
| align="center"| 6
| align="center"|Episode Six 
| align="center"| Margaret Simpson
| align="center"| Richard Kelly
| align="center"| 25 January 1991
|-
| style="background:white" colspan="5" | Julie finds herself being ignored. Mike finds out about the dance Georgina shared with Don. Trevor begins to sell takeaway pizzas in the school playground.
|- style="background:#333333; height:2px"
| colspan="5" |
|-
| align="center"| 7
| align="center"| Episode Seven
| align="center"| Kevin Hood
| align="center"| Richard Kelly
| align="center"| 29 January 1991
|-
| style="background:white" colspan="5" | The school begins to charge its pupils for the use of lockers. Mr. Robson is involved in an accident while he and Mike are out on his motorcycle.
|- style="background:#333333; height:2px"
| colspan="5" |
|-
| align="center"| 8
| align="center"| Episode Eight
| align="center"| Chris Ellis
| align="center"| Richard Kelly
| align="center"| 1 February 1991
|-
| style="background:white" colspan="5" | Alice and Becky find out that Chrissy is going to have a baby. Ms. Booth offers Chrissy some advice. Cecile gives Mike a visa application for America. 
|- style="background:#333333; height:2px"
| colspan="5" |
|-
| align="center"| 9
| align="center"| Episode Nine
| align="center"| Margaret Simpson
| align="center"| Albert Barber
| align="center"| 5 February 1991
|-
| style="background:white" colspan="5" | The news that Chrissy is pregnant is spread around the school along with the false rumour that the father is Mr. Van Der Groot. Julie is desperate to be liked.
|- style="background:#333333; height:2px"
| colspan="5" |
|-
| align="center"| 10
| align="center"| Episode Ten
| align="center"| Margaret Simpson
| align="center"| Albert Barber
| align="center"| 8 February 1991
|-
| style="background:white" colspan="5" | Trevor gives up the lunchtime pizza business. Julie ends up going missing.
|- style="background:#333333; height:2px"
| colspan="5" |
|-
| align="center"| 11
| align="center"| Episode Eleven
| align="center"| Barry Purchese
| align="center"| Richard Kelly
| align="center"| 12 February 1991
|-
| style="background:white" colspan="5" | Alice is taught a lesson in victimisation by Mrs Monroe. Richard sells some t-shirts to help raise money for Matthew. The contents of the smuggler's shed are finally revealed.
|- style="background:#333333; height:2px"
| colspan="5" |
|-
| align="center"| 12
| align="center"| Episode Twelve
| align="center"| Chris Ellis
| align="center"| Albert Barber
| align="center"| 15 February 1991 
|-
| style="background:white" colspan="5" | Justine works out that Chrissy is pregnant after all and lied about her test results on a school trip to Dartmoor.
|- style="background:#333333; height:2px"
| colspan="5" |
|-
| align="center"| 13
| align="center"| Episode Thirteen
| align="center"| Chris Ellis
| align="center"| Albert Barber
| align="center"| 19 February 1991
|-
| style="background:white" colspan="5" |The pupils have to take part in one last initiative test on the Dartmoor trip. Matthew is able to get even with Ray and Richard. Trevor and Ted's dinner party fails to impress Georgina and Calley.
|- style="background:#333333; height:2px"
| colspan="5" |
|-
| align="center"| 14
| align="center"| Episode Fourteen
| align="center"| Sarah Daniels
| align="center"| Richard Kelly
| align="center"| 22 February 1991
|-
| style="background:white" colspan="5" | News that Chrissy is going to have a baby spreads around the school. Mrs. McCluskey decides to retire.
|- style="background:#333333; height:2px"
| colspan="5" |
|-
| align="center"| 15
| align="center"| Episode Fifteen
| align="center"| Kevin Hood
| align="center"| Richard Kelly
| align="center"| 26 February 1991
|-
| style="background:white" colspan="5" | A model boat race is held at the school. The true about what the "smugglers" are up to is revealed. Brian needs a bone marrow transplant.
|- style="background:#333333; height:2px"
| colspan="5" |
|-
| align="center"| 16
| align="center"| Episode Sixteen
| align="center"| David Angus
| align="center"| Richard Kelly
| align="center" | 1 March 1991
|-
| style="background:white" colspan="5" | Mr. Robson finds out about the pizza business. Georgina attempts to make Calley see that she needs to get glasses. Chrissy's father isn't happy to find out that his daughter is pregnant.
|- style="background:#333333; height:2px"
| colspan="5" |
|-
| align="center"| 17
| align="center"| Episode Seventeen
| align="center"| Kevin Hood
| align="center"| David Andrews
| align="center"| 5 March 1991
|-
| style="background:white" colspan="5" |Interviews take part for the headmaster position at the school. Matthew invites his friends around to see his new flat. Ray ruins Nick's jacket whilst on a night out.
|- style="background:#333333; height:2px"
| colspan="5" |
|-
| align="center"| 18
| align="center"| Episode Eighteen
| align="center"| David Angus
| align="center"| David Andrews
| align="center"| 8 March 1991
|-
| style="background:white" colspan="5" | Jamie sends Fran a letter. Nick is furious after seeing what Ray has done to his jacket. Calley's hotel work experience goes well.
|- style="background:#333333; height:2px"
| colspan="5" |
|-
| align="center"| 19
| align="center"| Episode Nineteen
| align="center"| David Angus
| align="center"| Albert Barber
| align="center"| 12 March 1991
|-
| style="background:white" colspan="5" |Ms. Booth takes part in a sponsored run. Jamie shows up unexpectedly to see Fran. Ted is invited to Chrissy's house.
|- style="background:#333333; height:2px"
| colspan="5" |
|-
| align="center"| 20
| align="center"| Episode Twenty
| align="center"| Sarah Daniels
| align="center"|David Andrews
| align="center"| 15 March 1991
|-
| style="background:white" colspan="5" | Mrs. McClusky is given a musical send off on her final day at the school and is given a variety of leaving presents.
|- style="background:#333333; height:2px"
| colspan="5" |
|-
|}

DVD release
The fourteenth series of Grange Hill has never been released on DVD as of 2014.

Notes

References

1991 British television seasons
Grange Hill